Kolliphor EL, formerly known as Cremophor EL, is the registered trademark of BASF Corp. for its version of polyethoxylated castor oil.  It is prepared by reacting 35 moles of ethylene oxide with each mole of castor oil. The resulting product is a mixture (CAS number 61791-12-6): the major component is the material in which the hydroxyl groups of the castor oil triglyceride have ethoxylated with ethylene oxide to form polyethylene glycol ethers. Minor components are the polyethyelene glycol esters of ricinoleic acid, polyethyelene glycols and polyethyelene glycol ethers of glycerol. Kolliphor EL is a synthetic, nonionic surfactant used to stabilize emulsions of nonpolar materials in water.

Kolliphor EL is an excipient or additive in drugs. Therapeutically, modern drugs are rarely given in a pure chemical state, so most active ingredients are combined with excipients or additives such as Kolliphor EL.

Uses
 Miconazole, anti-fungal
 Docetaxel, anti-cancer
 Aci-Jel (acetic acid / oxyquinoline / ricinoleic acid - vaginal)
 Sandimmune (cyclosporine injection, USP)
 Nelfinavir mesylate, HIV protease inhibitor
 Propofol, intravenous anaesthetic agent, originally presented in Kolliphor EL for trials; now presented in a lipid emulsion
 Diazepam injection; superseded by lipid emulsion alternative (Diazemuls)
 Vitamin K injection
 Ixabepilone, anti-cancer

Side effects
Allergic reactions to Taxol are most often allergic reactions to Kolliphor EL; symptoms include tightness in the chest, shortness of breath, and similar reactions consistent with severe anaphylactic reactions.  Although many anti-allergens including corticosteroids and Benadryl may be administered before chemotherapy, they are not always sufficient to prevent the severe reaction to Kolliphor EL.

Note that these should not be confused with the normal side effects of Taxol.  The allergic reaction is usually immediate and is similar to severe allergic reactions of many other substances that trigger allergic reactions.

BASF offers a purified, injectable version of Kolliphor EL, known as Kolliphor ELP.

See also
 Castor oil

References

Excipients